J. Kirk Sullivan was an Idaho Republican Party chairman and lobbyist.

Personal life 
Sullivan and his wife had two children and three grandchildren.

Originally from South Carolina, Sullivan attended Clemson University, where he earned a Ph.D. & M.S. in chemistry. He also attended the Massachusetts Institute of Technology Program for Senior Executives.

Career 
Sullivan was a member of U.S. Army Reserves. He worked for a mining company, FMC Corp., has an engineer, technical superintendent, and marketing manager for 13 years.

Sullivan has served on the Commission for the Future of Clemson, the Clemson University College of Engineering and Science Philanthropic Development Leadership Committee and on the chemistry department's advisory board. He is also a member of Clemson's prestigious Thomas Green Clemson Academy of Engineers and Scientists.

Sullivan started to work at Boise Cascade Co. in 1971 and rose to the position of vice president for governmental and environmental affairs in 1981 and retired in 1998.

Sullivan earned the Distinguished Eagle Scout Award in 2005.

On May 23, 2007, Saint Alphonsus Foundation recognized Sullivan with its 2007 Distinguished Citizen Award.

Political career 
In 1996 Sullivan tried to become University of Idaho President but failed.

Sullivan and Greg Casey founded Veritas Advisors in 1999, a lobbying, political campaigns, communications, issue advocacy, and business and association management group.

Sullivan was the head of Idaho Association of Commerce and Industry and dealt with mostly Governmental & Environmental Affairs. He earned the Pat K. Harwood Award in 1997 from the group.

Idaho Republican Party Chair 
Sullivan was first elected has state chair in 2004. Was defeated for reelection in 2008 by Norm Semanko. He dealt with making Idaho Republican Party a closed primary.  China Veldhouse Gum (2004) and Jayson Ronk (2006-2007) served as executive director during his term as chair.

Community involvement 
Sullivan served on the oversight board for the Public Employment Retirement System of Idaho (PERSI) from first being appointed in 1996. He was scheduled to continue to serve till July 1, 2021.

References 

Idaho Republicans
Living people
1935 births